Basque pelota was on the program for the first time at the 1995 Pan American Games in Mar del Plata, Argentina.

Men's events

Women's events

Open events

Medal table

Events at the 1995 Pan American Games
1995
1995 Pan American Games
Basque pelota competitions in Argentina